Clausospicula is a genus of Australian plants in the grass family. The only known species is Clausospicula extensa, native to Northern Territory.

References

Andropogoneae
Monotypic Poaceae genera
Endemic flora of Australia